Siua Pututau Maile (born 18 February 1997) is a Tongan rugby union player who generally plays as a hooker for Benetton in United Rugby Championship. Siua is married to Mele Vuka Maile and has two son’s VaiTo’I Maile, Siosiua Maile.

Life 
Siua grew up in Tonga since his birth and moved to New Zealand in 2013 to pursue a rugby scholarship at Timaru Boys' High School and later became a roofer in Christchurch.

Career 
He played for Manawatu from 2020 to 2022 and for Hurricanes in Super Rugby in 2022.
He made his international debut for Tonga against New Zealand in a World Cup warm-up match on 7 September 2019.He represented also  Tonga for the 2019 Rugby World Cup which was held in Japan for the first time and also marks his first World Cup appearance. Prior to his World Cup call, he served as a roofer in Christchurch. He made his debut World Cup match appearance in a Pool C match against England on 22 September 2019.

References

External links
 

1997 births
Living people
Tongan rugby union players
Tonga international rugby union players
Rugby union hookers
Tongan expatriates in New Zealand
Manawatu rugby union players
Hurricanes (rugby union) players
Benetton Rugby players